Ivan Atanasov (born 31 October 1957) is a Bulgarian wrestler. He competed in the men's Greco-Roman 68 kg at the 1980 Summer Olympics.

References

External links
 

1957 births
Living people
Bulgarian male sport wrestlers
Olympic wrestlers of Bulgaria
Wrestlers at the 1980 Summer Olympics
Place of birth missing (living people)